D-Generation X: In Your House (also spelled as Degeneration X: In Your House) was the 19th In Your House professional wrestling pay-per-view (PPV) event produced by the World Wrestling Federation (WWF, now WWE). It took place on December 7, 1997, at the Springfield Civic Center in Springfield, Massachusetts. Eight matches were contested at the event.

In the main event, Ken Shamrock defeated Shawn Michaels by disqualification in a match for the WWF Championship; Michaels thus retained his title. Notable matches on the undercard included Stone Cold Steve Austin defeating The Rock to retain the WWF Intercontinental Championship, The New Age Outlaws defeating the Legion of Doom by disqualification to retain the WWF Tag Team Championship, and WWF Commissioner Sgt. Slaughter coming out of retirement to lose a Boot Camp match to Triple H. Although the In Your House name would be used for various pay-per-views into 1999 this would be the last such event where it would be recognized as a show in the original In Your House series according to the WWE Network.

Production

Background
In Your House was a series of monthly pay-per-view (PPV) shows first produced by the World Wrestling Federation (WWF, now WWE) in May 1995. They aired when the promotion was not holding one of its then-five major PPVs (WrestleMania, King of the Ring, SummerSlam, Survivor Series, and Royal Rumble), and were sold at a lower cost. D-Generation X: In Your House (also spelled as Degeneration X: In Your House) was the 19th In Your House event and took place on December 7, 1997, at the Springfield Civic Center in Springfield, Massachusetts. The name of the show was based on the more prominent matches featuring members of D-Generation X.

Storylines
The main feud heading into D-Generation X: In Your House was between Shawn Michaels and Ken Shamrock over the WWF Championship. The feud started after Bret Hart left the WWF to join rival company World Championship Wrestling (WCW) after the infamous "Montreal Screwjob" at Survivor Series. Shamrock, who returned from an injury, which had been caused by the Nation of Domination in September, was the number one contender for Michaels' WWF Championship. On the December 1 episode of Raw is War, Michaels taunted Shamrock, saying that he would not be able to break Michaels' ankle (a reference to Shamrock's signature ankle lock). Later on that night, Michaels and his D-Generation X teammates, Chyna and Triple H, humiliated and assaulted Jim "The Anvil" Neidhart, until Shamrock and WWF commissioner Sgt. Slaughter saved Neidhart, with Shamrock locking in the Ankle Lock on Michaels and Sgt. Slaughter locking the Cobra Clutch on Triple H. Slaughter then challenged Triple H to a Boot Camp match, which he accepted.

Stone Cold Steve Austin and The Rock feuded over the WWF Intercontinental Championship. On the November 17 episode of Raw is War, The Rock stole Austin's Intercontinental Championship after Austin took a beating at the hands of The Rock's Nation of Domination stablemates. In the weeks preceding D-Generation X: In Your House, The Rock taunted Austin, declaring himself the "best damn Intercontinental Champion there ever was".

Event  
The opening bout was the final match in a tournament to determine the inaugural WWF Light Heavyweight Championship, with Brian Christopher facing Taka Michinoku. The match ended when Christopher attempted to give Michinoku a Tennessee Jam and missed, enabling Michinoku to give Christopher a Michinoku Driver and then pin him to win the title.

The second bout was a six-man tag team match pitting the Disciples of Apocalypse against Los Boricuas. Los Boricuas won the bout by pinfall following a leg drop by Miguel Pérez Jr.

The third bout was a "toughman match" between Marc Mero and professional boxer Butterbean. The match ended in the fourth round when Mero gave Butterbean a low blow, drawing a disqualification, then attacked him with a stool until being driven away.

The fourth bout saw WWF Tag Team Champions the New Age Outlaws defend their titles against the Legion of Doom. The match ended when Henry Godwinn came to the ring and hit Animal with a "slop bucket", after which Hawk seized the bucket and used it to hit Billy Gunn, resulting in the Legion of Doom being disqualified.

The fifth bout was a "Boot Camp match" between Sgt. Slaughter and Triple H. The match ended when Slaughter applied the cobra clutch to Triple H, only for Triple H's bodyguard Chyna to give him a low blow, enabling Triple H to give Slaughter a Pedigree and then pin him.

The sixth bout was a singles match between Jeff Jarrett and The Undertaker. Jarrett won the match by disqualification after Kane entered the ring to attack The Undertaker, chokeslamming Jarrett after he got in his way. After Kane left the ring, Jarrett attacked The Undertaker from behind, only to be chokeslammed again.

The seventh bout saw WWF Intercontinental Champion Stone Cold Steve Austin defend his title against The Rock. The match began Austin driving a pickup truck to ringside and brawling with The Rock's Nation of Domination allies, including back body dropping D'Lo Brown through the truck's windshield. Towards the end of the match, Austin accidentally gave a Stone Cold Stunner to the referee. Austin then gave a Stone Cold Stunner to The Rock and pinned him, with a second referee counting the pinfall.

The main event saw WWF Champion Shawn Michaels defend his title against Ken Shamrock. The match ended when Shamrock applied an ankle lock to Michaels, upon which Michaels' D-Generation X allies Triple H and Chyna attacked Shamrock before Michaels could submit, resulting in Shamrock winning the bout by disqualification (meaning the title did not change hands). Following the match, Owen Hart made his return to the WWF, attacking Michaels before retreating into the audience.

Reception

In 2014, Kevin Pantoja of 411Mania gave the event a rating of 4.0 [Poor], stating, "Too many disqualification finishes. Of the eight matches, four of them ended in a DQ. The opener was the best match and the final two matches weren't terrible. The six man tag, Butterbean stuff, Tag Title match and Boot Camp match were all crap though and that's too much crap on one show."

Results

WWF Light Heavyweight Championship tournament
The tournament to determine the inaugural WWF Light Heavyweight Champion was held between November 3 and December 7, 1997. The tournament brackets were:

Notes:
1 
2 
3

Other on-screen talent

References

External links 
 

In Your House
Entertainment events in Massachusetts
Professional wrestling in Massachusetts
1997 in Massachusetts
1997 WWF pay-per-view events
December 1997 events in the United States
20th century in Springfield, Massachusetts